Sophie Ikenye is a BBC news presenter from Kenya. She is a main presenter for Focus on Africa (TV programme) on BBC World News. She worked in the broadcasting industry in Kenya for 12 years before joining the BBC.

Career
Ikenye studied mass communication in Kenya and got an internship at the Kenya Broadcasting Corporation (KBC). She worked at KBC, Citizen TV, NTV Kenya

She applied for a position at the BBC World Service in London which was looking for three presenters from East, West and South Africa, and got the job. In 2009 she started presenting Focus on Africa (Radio Version) which she did for three years before the program went onscreen in 2012 where she still followed it and remains one of the main presenters of the show.

In her media and journalism career, Ikenye has covered key events in Africa, including the 2011 Nigerian presidential elections, the Libya crisis and led the coverage of the 2013 Kenyan elections. She has interviewed more than 10 African presidents and other prominent personalities.

In 2017, Sophie Ikenye alongside Peter Okwoche, Paul Bakibinga, Salim Kikeke and Dayo Yusufu visited Uganda  where they broadcast Focus on Africa for a week. She also guest celebrity anchored the PM Live news on Urban TV.

Awards
In 2016, Sophie Ikenye was listed on the 100 Most Influential Young Africans by Africa Youth Awards. She was at the same time listed on the 100 Most Influential Young Kenyans.

See also
Nancy Kacungira
Lukwesa Burak
Komla Dumor

References

BBC television presenters
BBC World News shows
BBC World News
BBC newsreaders and journalists
Kenyan journalists
Living people
Year of birth missing (living people)